Khodabandeh (electoral district) is the 3rd electoral district in the Zanjan Province of Iran. It has a population of 169,553 and elects 1 member of parliament.

1980
MP in 1980 from the electorate of Khodabandeh. (1st)
 Mohsen Rahami

1984
MP in 1984 from the electorate of Khodabandeh. (2nd)
 Mohsen Rahami

1988
MP in 1988 from the electorate of Khodabandeh. (3rd)
 Morovvatollah Parto

1992
MP in 1992 from the electorate of Khodabandeh. (4th)
 Seyyed Mohammadi Ali Mosavi

1996
MP in 1996 from the electorate of Khodabandeh. (5th)
 Seyyed Mohammadi Ali Mosavi

2000
MP in 2000 from the electorate of Khodabandeh. (6th)
  Morovvatollah Parto

2004
MP in 2004 from the electorate of Khodabandeh. (7th)
 Mohammad Soltani

2008
MP in 2008 from the electorate of Khodabandeh. (8th)
 Fazel Mousavi

2012
MP in 2012 from the electorate of Khodabandeh. (9th)
 Seyyed Mohammadi Ali Mosavi

2016

Notes

References

Electoral districts of Zanjan Province
Khodabandeh County
Deputies of Khodabandeh